Our Lady of Bethlehem Abbey, a Cistercian monastery in Portglenone, County Antrim, Northern Ireland, was founded in 1948 by Mount Melleray Abbey in County Waterford. The monks bought Portglenone House, a country mansion built about the year 1810 by the Church of Ireland Bishop, Dr. Alexander who demolished the local castle. History records that Sir Roger Casement often stayed in the house in the early years of the 20th century.

Despite opposition from local Protestants, the monastery succeeded in establishing itself in the locality and ran a successful dairy farm for many years. Our Lady of Bethlehem Abbey was the first enclosed monastery of men to be established in Northern Ireland since the Reformation.

The monastery belongs to the Order of Cistercians of the Strict Observance (OCSO), also known as Trappists, who follow the Rule of St Benedict, but emphasise some of the more austere and penitential aspects of the Rule such as strict silence, abstention from meat, early rising and physical work.

In the 1960s, the community built a new monastery designed in a modern style by  Padraig Ó Muireadhaigh. The building has won several architectural awards. To establish continuity with the Order's past, stones from some of the pre-Reformation Irish Cistercian abbeys were incorporated in the church and cloisters.

Abbots
 1953 - Abbot Oliver Farrell - Superior from 1948-1953
 1958 - Abbot Aengus Dunphy (1921-2014) - subsequently from 1979-1991 he was chaplain in Our Lady of Praise, Butende.
 1977 - Abbot Celsus Kelly

See also
 Abbeys and priories 
in Northern Ireland (County Antrim)

References

External links 

Cistercian monasteries in Northern Ireland
Christian organizations established in 1948
Buildings and structures in County Antrim
Trappist monasteries in the United Kingdom
Religion in County Antrim
1948 establishments in Northern Ireland